The 1996 NCAA Division I men's basketball tournament involved 64 schools playing in single-elimination play to determine the national champion of men's  NCAA Division I college basketball. It began on March 14, 1996, and ended with the championship game on April 1 at Continental Airlines Arena (now known as Meadowlands Arena) in the Meadowlands Sports Complex in East Rutherford, New Jersey. A total of 63 games were played.

The Final Four venue was notable for several reasons:
This marked the first time that the NCAA finals had been held in Greater New York since 1950.
This was also the last (men's) Final Four to be held in a basketball/hockey-specific facility. Every Final Four since has been held in a domed stadium (usually built for football) because of NCAA venue capacity requirements. Therefore, this was also the last time the NCAA finals have been held in the Greater New York area and the Northeastern United States (for the time being).
The Final Four consisted of Kentucky, making its first appearance in the Final Four since 1993 and eleventh overall, Massachusetts, making its first ever appearance in the Final Four, Syracuse, making its third appearance in the Final Four and first since 1987, and Mississippi State, also making its first appearance.

Kentucky won its sixth national championship by defeating Syracuse in the final game 76–67.

Tony Delk of Kentucky was named the tournament's Most Outstanding Player. Kentucky's run to the championship was one of the most dominant in NCAA tournament history, as the Wildcats won each of their first four games by at least 20 points and won every game by at least 7 points.

The committee that put together the bracket in 1996 was criticized for placing what seemed to be the best two teams in college basketball Massachusetts and Kentucky on the same side of the bracket so that they faced each other in the national semifinal not the final game itself.  Note that there are guidelines that the selection committee follows. In 2004 the procedure would be changed so that the regional sites would first be assigned their #1 seeds, then would be placed in the bracket so that the #1 overall seed would face the fourth #1 seed while the second #1 seed would face the third #1 seed, barring any upsets. Although Kentucky was the tourney favorite, Connecticut, led by star guard Ray Allen, was the presumed #1 overall seed that season, after compiling a 30–2 record during the season in a strong Big East Conference, including a conference tournament victory over Georgetown-led by Allen Iverson, who went on to be the number one pick in the draft following the season. Meanwhile, Kentucky was apparently dropped to #3 overall seed following its defeat to Mississippi State in the SEC conference tournament final. Kentucky also could not be placed in the Southeast region since the Sweet 16 and Elite 8 games were being played in Kentucky's home arena, Rupp Arena.

Massachusetts, coached by John Calipari, was later stripped of its wins, including the UMass Minutemen's Final Four appearance, by the NCAA because UMass star Marcus Camby had accepted illegal gifts from agents. Connecticut, coached by Jim Calhoun, was additionally punished monetarily due to players accepting illegal gifts from agents.

The 1996 tournament was the last to feature teams from the Big Eight and Southwest Conferences; later that year the two would form the Big Twelve Conference. As of 2022 they are the last Division I conferences to disband and/or merge after sending teams to the NCAA tournament.

Schedule and venues

The following are the sites that were selected to host each round of the 1996 tournament:

First and Second Rounds
March 14 and 16
East Region
 Providence Civic Center, Providence, Rhode Island (Host: Providence College)
Midwest Region
 Reunion Arena, Dallas, Texas (Host: Southwest Conference)
Southeast Region
 RCA Dome, Indianapolis, Indiana (Hosts: Butler University, Midwestern Collegiate Conference)
West Region
 University Arena ("The Pit"), Albuquerque, New Mexico (Host: University of New Mexico)
March 15 and 17
East Region
 Richmond Coliseum, Richmond, Virginia (Hosts: University of Richmond, Virginia Commonwealth University)
Midwest Region
 Bradley Center, Milwaukee, Wisconsin (Host: Marquette University)
Southeast Region
 Orlando Arena, Orlando, Florida (Host: Stetson University)
West Region
 ASU Activity Center, Tempe, Arizona (Host: Arizona State University)

Regional semifinals and finals (Sweet Sixteen and Elite Eight)
March 21 and 23
East Regional, Georgia Dome, Atlanta, Georgia (Host: Georgia Institute of Technology)
Midwest Regional, Hubert H. Humphrey Metrodome, Minneapolis, Minnesota (Host: University of Minnesota)
March 22 and 24
Southeast Regional, Rupp Arena, Lexington, Kentucky (Host: University of Kentucky)
West Regional, McNichols Sports Arena, Denver, Colorado (Host: University of Colorado)

National semifinals and championship (Final Four and championship)
March 30 and April 1
Continental Airlines Arena, East Rutherford, New Jersey (Hosts: Seton Hall University, Big East Conference)

East Rutherford became the 25th different host city, and the Continental Airlines Arena the 30th host venue, to host the Final Four. While the New York metropolitan area is the largest metropolitan area to host the Final Four, and had previously at the old Madison Square Garden, the town of East Rutherford itself is the smallest town to host a Final Four. Once more, all four regional sites were former and future Final Four sites. The only new venue of the tournament was the Georgia Dome, which would host five regional rounds and three Final Fours before closing in 2017. Any future tournament games to be held in New Jersey would be played at the Prudential Center; if in Atlanta, the Mercedes-Benz Stadium or State Farm Arena; if in Orlando, the Amway Center.

Teams

Bracket
* Denotes overtime period

East Regional – Atlanta

Regional Final summary

Midwest Regional – Minneapolis

Regional Final summary

Southeast Regional – Lexington, Kentucky

Regional Final summary

West Regional – Denver, Colorado

Regional Final summary

Final Four at East Rutherford, New Jersey

# On May 8, 1997, the NCAA Executive Committee voted to negate the Minutemen's 1996 NCAA Tournament record, for Marcus Camby's acceptance of agents' improper gifts. The team's 35–2 season record was reduced to 31–1, and the UMass slot in the Final Four is officially marked as "vacated". The Final Four trophy, banner, and 45% of tournament revenue were returned to the NCAA. Camby reimbursed the school for the lost revenue.

Game summaries

National Championship

Announcers
Jim Nantz/Bob Rathbun and Billy Packer First & Second Round at Milwaukee, Wisconsin; Southeast Regional at Lexington, Kentucky; Final Four at East Rutherford, New Jersey
Sean McDonough and Bill Raftery First & Second Round at Orlando, Florida; Midwest Regional at Minneapolis, Minnesota
Tim Ryan and Al McGuire First & Second Round at Providence, Rhode Island; West Regional at Denver, Colorado
Gus Johnson and Quinn Buckner First & Second Round at Indianapolis; East Regional at Atlanta, Georgia
Mike Gorman and George Raveling First & Second Round at Dallas, Texas
Ted Robinson and Larry Farmer First & Second Round at Richmond, Virginia
Tim Brando and Derrek Dickey First & Second Round at Albuquerque, New Mexico
Bill Macatee and Dan Bonner First & Second Round at Tempe, Arizona

Note: During the Midwest Regional Final in Minneapolis; sideline reporter Michele Tafoya temporarily substituted for Sean McDonough in the play-by-play booth when McDonough became ill; calling about 10 minutes of the first half before McDonough felt well enough to resume play-by-play; in the process making her the first woman to call part of an NCAA Men's Division I Tournament game.

See also
 1996 NCAA Division II men's basketball tournament
 1996 NCAA Division III men's basketball tournament
 1996 NCAA Division I women's basketball tournament
 1996 NCAA Division II women's basketball tournament
 1996 NCAA Division III women's basketball tournament
 1996 National Invitation Tournament
 1996 National Women's Invitation Tournament
 1996 NAIA Division I men's basketball tournament
 1996 NAIA Division II men's basketball tournament
 1996 NAIA Division I women's basketball tournament
 1996 NAIA Division II women's basketball tournament

References

NCAA Division I men's basketball tournament
Ncaa
Basketball in the Dallas–Fort Worth metroplex
NCAA Men's Division I Basketball Championship
NCAA Division I men's basketball tournament
NCAA Division I men's basketball tournament